Gao Chong (died  527 AD) was a Chinese official of the Northern Wei Dynasty with the courtesy name of Jishan, from the Bohai Commandery.

Biography
His mother, Princess Wuwei, was the daughter of Juqu Mujian of Northern Liang and of Queen Tuoba of Northern Wei. Gao Chong's mother Princess Wuwei was saddened by this, and he followed her will by becoming the heir of Juqu Mujian, changing his surname to Juqu. Emperor Xiaowen of Wei appointed him , and he was transferred to Sangonglang of Shangshu. In the next year, his surname Gao was restored, he inherited his father's title, and was appointed Chief of the Army, General Fubo, and Governor of Luoyang County. In the administration of the county, he did not hesitate to expose the influential people, and the government officials and the people feared his majesty. He was about to be promoted by the Imperial court but he died of illness before he could receive the promotion, aged thirty-seven. He was posthumously given the rank of Governor of Yuyang County. He also received the Posthumous name of Chéng.

Family
Issue:
 Gao Qianzhi (高謙之)
 Gao Gongzhi (高恭之), that is Gao Daomu (高道穆)
 Gao Jinzhi (高謹之), the descendant of the Juqu Clan, who served as the head of the Pingdong House in Cangzhou, died at the age of 35)
 Gao Shenzhi (高慎之), died at the age of 23

References

Sources
 Wei Shu, Volume 77, Biography 65
 History of the Northern Dynasties, Volume 50, Biography 38

6th-century Chinese people
6th-century Chinese military personnel
Northern Wei people
Xiongnu